Ibrahim Salameh, SMSP (born December 10, 1945 in Marmarita, Homs Governorate, Syria) is the current Apostolic Exarch of the Melkite Greek Catholic Apostolic Exarchate of Argentina.

Life

Ibrahim Salameh joined to the Missionary Society of Saint Paul and received on 13 July 1975 the sacrament of Holy Orders.

On August 15, 2013 Pope Francis appointed him titular bishop of Palmyra of Greek Melkites and named him to the Melkite Apostolic Exarchate of Argentina. The Melkite Greek Catholic Patriarch of Antioch, Gregory III Laham, BS, gave him on September 28 of the same year, the episcopal ordination, and his co-consecrators were the Archbishop of Beirut and Byblos, Cyril Salim Bustros SMSP, and the Archbishop of Baalbek, Elias Rahal, SMSP.

References

External links
 http://www.catholic-hierarchy.org/bishop/bsalameh.html

1945 births
Living people
Melkite Greek Catholic bishops
Syrian Melkite Greek Catholics
People from Homs Governorate